When the Going Gets Dark is an album by Quasi.  It was released on March 21, 2006, on Touch and Go Records.  It was released in Europe by Domino Records.

Track listing

Personnel

 Sam Coomes – guitar, vocals
 Janet Weiss – drums, vocals
 Dave Fridmann – mixing, producer
 Jacob Hall – recording engineer
 Steven Wray Lobdell – recording engineer
 William McCurtin – cover painting
 Roger Seibel – mastering
 Kendra Wright – recording engineer

References

2006 albums
Domino Recording Company albums
Quasi albums
Touch and Go Records albums